Hemwati Nandan Bahuguna (25 April 1919 – 17 March 1989) was an Indian National Congress leader and former Chief Minister of Uttar Pradesh; he later joined Bharatiya Lok Dal and worked with Charan Singh.

Personal life
He was born on 25 April 1919 in Bughani, Pauri Garhwal, Uttarakhand in a Garhwali Brahmin family. The family later moved to Allahabad in Uttar Pradesh.

Little is known about his first marriage. His first wife always lived in his native village Bughani as a simple village woman.
His second wife, Kamala Bahuguna, lived with him in Allahabad and was mother of their three children:
Their eldest son Vijay Bahuguna served as the Chief Minister of Uttarakhand. He was a former judge of Allahabad and Bombay High Court. He is member of Bharatiya Janata Party. Vijay's son Saurabh is a Member of the Uttarakhand Legislative Assembly from BJP . He is currently serving as the Minister of Animal Husbandry, Fisheries, Skill development & Employment, Protocol and Sugarcane Development in the Pushkar Singh Dhami's cabinet of 2022.
Second son Shekhar Bahuguna.
The couple's daughter, Rita Bahuguna Joshi was chief of  UP Pradesh Congress committee. She also served as the Mayor of Allahabad. She is member of Bharatiya Janata Party.

Politics

Pre independence

Students Parliament
He studied in D.A.V. School and Messmore Inter College of Pauri Town. He passed 10th from Pauri and went to the Government Intermediate College in Allahabad in 1937 in the Bachelor of Science programme. He received an Arts degree in 1946.

In jail
He was jailed as a part of Quit India movement from 1942 to 1946.

Post independence

Union Cabinet
In 1971, he was made State Minister for Communication in the Union Cabinet.

Chief Minister of Uttar Pradesh
In 1973, he was appointed the Chief Minister of Uttar Pradesh, the most populous state in India. However, his tenure was short and he was forced to resign by Prime minister Indira Gandhi in 1975.

Parting of ways with the Congress
In early 1977, when Indira Gandhi lifted the state emergency and called for new elections to the Lok Sabha, Bahuguna left the ruling Congress party of Indira and formed a new group called Congress for Democracy (CFD) with Jagjivan Ram and Nandini Satpathy. The CFD joined the Janata alliance to contest the elections. After the victory of the Janata alliance, Bahuguna joined the cabinet of Janata Prime Minister Morarji Desai as  the minister of chemicals and fertilizers.
In 1979, he became the Finance Minister under the short lived (August - December 1979) Charan Singh administration. During his term, Indian economy went into the last recession of the 20th century. Real GDP growth fell by massive 5.2% in 1979 due to the global energy crisis. Bahuguna withdrew from the government and joined hands with Indira Gandhi in October 1979.

In the January 1980 Parliamentary elections  he won from Garhwal as Indira Gandhi's Congress(I) party candidate. But, he soon left the party and resigned his seat subsequently. He won the by-election for the seat in 1982.

1984 Lok Sabha Elections
He contested against the Congress candidate, Amitabh Bachchan, in 1984 Parliamentary elections from Allahabad constituency. Bachchan won the election by approximately 1,87,000 votes. Later his wife Kamla Bahuguna also stood for by-elections from Allahabad.

Electoral history
 1971 : Elected to Lok Sabha from Allahabad as member of Congress
 1977 : Elected to Lok Sabha from Lucknow as member of 'Congress For Democracy', supported by Janata Party
 1980 : Elected to Lok Sabha from Garhwal as member of Congress, but soon quit both Congress and Lok Sabha 
 1982 bypoll : Elected to Lok Sabha from Garhwal, defeating his Congress rival 
 1984 : Lost to Amitabh Bachchan in Prayagraj (Allahabad)

Death
Bahuguna fell ill in 1988 and flew to the United States for coronary bypass surgery. The surgery was unsuccessful and he died 17 March 1989 in a Cleveland hospital.

Legacy
 Hemwati Nandan Bahuguna Garhwal University, Uttarakhand's largest university in Srinagar, Pauri Garhwal
 Hemwati Nandan Bahuguna Uttarakhand Medical Education University, in Dehradun, Uttarakhand

References

External links

 Chief Ministers of Uttar Pradesh
 
 Biography
 Bahugana's daughter runs in Amethi
 MINISTERS
 H.N.Bahuguna: A man who could have been Prime Minister

1919 births
1989 deaths
Politicians from Allahabad
Chief Ministers of Uttar Pradesh
Indian National Congress politicians
Lok Dal politicians
Bharatiya Lok Dal politicians
Janata Party politicians
People from Pauri Garhwal district
Dayanand Anglo-Vedic Schools System alumni
India MPs 1977–1979
Uttar Pradesh MLAs 1952–1957
Uttar Pradesh MLAs 1957–1962
Uttar Pradesh MLAs 1969–1974
State cabinet ministers of Uttar Pradesh
Lok Sabha members from Uttar Pradesh
India MPs 1980–1984
Chief ministers from Indian National Congress
Finance Ministers of India
Ministers for Corporate Affairs
Petroleum and Natural Gas Ministers of India
Members of the Cabinet of India
India MPs 1971–1977
Congress for Democracy politicians